The McClure River is a  tributary of the Russell Fork in the U.S. state of Virginia. It is located in Dickenson County in the southwestern part of the state. Via the Russell Fork, the Levisa Fork, the Big Sandy River, and the Ohio River, it is part of the Mississippi River watershed.

See also
List of rivers of Virginia

References

USGS Hydrologic Unit Map - State of Virginia (1974)

Rivers of Virginia
Bodies of water of Dickenson County, Virginia